Princess Supreme Noguk (d. 8 March 1365), also known as Queen Indeok and Queen Mother Indeok during her stepson, King U of Goryeo's reign, was a Yuan dynasty imperial family member as the great-granddaughter of Darmabala and niece of Princess Joguk who became a Korean queen consort though her marriage with Gongmin of Goryeo as his primary wife. Her personal name was Borjigin Budashiri (or ). She was the last Mongol ethnic who become Goryeo's queen consort.

Life
The future Princess Noguk was born Budashiri, a member of the Yuan dynasty's ruling Borjigin clan and a great-great-great-granddaughter of Kublai Khan. Though her birth year is unknown, she is recorded as having married the reformist monarch Gongmin of Goryeo in the Yuan capital of Khanbaliq in 1349, after which she went to live in Goryeo.

Queen Noguk's marriage followed a practice established by Kublai Khan, where female members of the Yuan imperial clan were married to Goryeo princes in order to maintain Yuan hegemony on the Korean peninsula. By contrast with earlier marriages between the Yuan and Goryeo dynasties, however, Budashiri's marriage to Gongmin was described as happy and after her arrival in Goryeo, the Yuan gave Budashiri title as Princess Seungui (승의공주, 承懿公主).

When King Gongmin implemented the half-member policy, the Princess rejected her homeland, helped her husband and monopolized his love to her. Despite their close relationship, they were childless. Budashiri then became pregnant fifteen years after marriage, but died in 1365 from complications related to the childbirth.

After her death, King Gongmin was said to be very sad and became indifferent to politics with entrusted great tasks to a Buddhist monk, Pyeonjo, who was executed in 1371. King Gongmin was killed in his sleep by Hong Ryun (홍륜), Choe Man-saeng (최만생), and others in 1374.

Legacy 

King Gongmin began the construction of a tomb near Kaeseong after Queen Noguk's death. The queen was interred under the mound Jeongreung, and her husband was later buried under an accompanying mound known as Hyeonreung.

In 1367, she posthumously received the title "princess supreme" – typically accorded to aunts of emperors (even though she was not).

According to the Veritable Records of the Joseon Dynasty, the tenth king Yeonsan believed that Queen Noguk had looked similar to his mother, the deposed Queen Yun, so he collected Queen Noguk's portraits at government offices.

In popular culture

Television series
Portrayed by Sunwoo Eun-sook in the 1983 KBS TV series Foundation of the Kingdom.
Portrayed by Seo Ji-hye in the 2005–2006 MBC TV series Shin Don.
Portrayed by Park Se-young in the 2012 SBS TV series Faith.
Portrayed by Bae Min-hee in the 2012–2013 SBS TV series The Great Seer.

Film
Portrayed by Choi Eun-hee in the 1967 film A Tender Heart.

Novel
Portrayed in the 1942 novel A Tender Heart (다정불심; a.k.a. "Tender Heartedness") by Park Jong-hwa.

See also
Goryeo under Mongol rule
Tomb of King Kongmin

References

External links
Art under control in North Korea - Tomb of King Kongmin
노국대장공주 on Encykorea .
인덕태후 on Doosan Encyclopedia .

14th-century Mongolian women
14th-century Korean people
1365 deaths
Mongol consorts of the Goryeo Dynasty
Year of birth unknown
Borjigin
14th-century Korean women
Princesses
Yuan dynasty people
Korean Buddhist monarchs
Deaths in childbirth